In an Off White Room is an EP by The Album Leaf, released on Troubleman Unlimited Records in 2001.

Track listing
"Project Loop"
"Glisten"
"Six AM"
"Off White Room"*
"Computer Love" (bonus track, by Kraftwerk)
 The track "Off White Room" is a recording of bird sounds which last about 23 minutes and after that the Kraftwerk song "Computer Love" plays.

The Album Leaf albums
2001 EPs